Farsiyeh-ye Do (also Romanized as Fārsīyeh-ye Do) is a village in Shoaybiyeh-ye Gharbi Rural District, Shadravan District, Shushtar County, Khuzestan Province, Iran. At the 2006 census, its population was 159, in 25 families.

References 

Populated places in Shushtar County